The 1946 Vermont Catamounts football team was an American football team that represented  the University of Vermont as a member of the Yankee Conference during the 1946 college football season. In their fourth year under head coach John C. Evans, the team compiled a 2–3–2 record.

Schedule

References

Vermont
Vermont Catamounts football seasons
Vermont Catamounts football